Philly D.A. is a 2021 American documentary series revolving around progressive Philadelphia, Pennsylvania, district attorney Larry Krasner. It consists of 8-episodes and premiered on PBS through Independent Lens on April 20, 2021.

Synopsis
The eight episode docuseries series follows Larry Krasner, a progressive district attorney in Philadelphia, Pennsylvania, through his election and first term.

Episodes

Release
The series had its world premiere at the Sundance Film Festival on February 2, 2021, with the first two episodes of the series. It also screened at the Berlin International Film Festival on March 2, 2021. PBS began airing the series on April 20, 2021, on Independent Lens. Topic released the series on July 1, 2021.

Reception

Critical reception
On Rotten Tomatoes, the series is “certified fresh” and holds an approval rating of 90% based on 21 reviews

Kathryn VanArendok of Vulture said that "Philly D.A. is the second coming of The Wire, in docuseries form… It’s compelling… it’s gripping… engrossing, and heartbreaking… The show should be viewed as a model for an entire genre of documentary storytelling. I’m totally mesmerized by this series, I could not stop watching it."
Matt Brennan of the Los Angeles Times said Philly D.A. is "the best TV show I've seen all year"  while Ben Travers of Indiewire said "I’m relatively sure it’s the best documentary series of 2021. It’s certainly the most illuminating, enthralling, and impressive..." Andy Dehnart of Reality Blurred called it "easily the best docuseries of 2021… cameras are present for some riveting moments, as if this were a masterfully scripted HBO drama… a rare and exceptional documentary reality series." Fionnuala Halligan of Screen Daily wrote, "Riveting...a must see."

Time magazine, Los Angeles Times, and Vulture included Philly D.A. on their lists of the "Best TV Shows of 2021".

Accolades

References

External links
 
 
 
 

2021 American television series debuts
2021 American television series endings
2020s American documentary television series
2020s American television miniseries
English-language television shows
Documentary television series about crime in the United States
Documentary television series about policing
Documentary television series about politics
PBS original programming
Television series about prosecutors